Joe Dennis Gilbert (born April 20, 1952) is a former Major League Baseball pitcher. Gilbert retired with one win and one save at the MLB level, both coming in 1973. His lone win in relief and it came on July 4, 1973 against the Mets. Ironically, Hall of Famer Tom Seaver got a no decision as the starting pitcher that day for the Mets. His one save came on May 5, 1973. Gilbert pitched the 9th inning to nail down a 8-6 Expos victory over the Reds.

References

External links

1952 births
Living people
African-American baseball players
American expatriate baseball players in Canada
Baseball players from Texas
Major League Baseball pitchers
Montreal Expos players
Peninsula Whips players
People from Jasper, Texas
Québec Carnavals players
West Palm Beach Expos players
21st-century African-American people
20th-century African-American sportspeople